Samuel Córdova  (born 13 March 1989) is a Mexican male volleyball player.  With his club Tigres UANL he competed at the 2012 FIVB Volleyball Men's Club World Championship.

References

External links
 profile at FIVB.org

1989 births
Living people
Mexican men's volleyball players
Place of birth missing (living people)
Olympic volleyball players of Mexico
Volleyball players at the 2016 Summer Olympics